
Threatened rays are those vulnerable to endangerment (extinction) in the near future. The International Union for Conservation of Nature (IUCN) ranks threatened species in three categories:

 Vulnerable species
 Endangered species
 Critically endangered species

The term threatened strictly refers to these three categories (critically endangered, endangered and vulnerable), while vulnerable is used to refer to the least at risk of these categories. The terms can be used somewhat interchangeably, as all vulnerable species are threatened, all endangered species are vulnerable and threatened, and all critically endangered species are endangered, vulnerable and threatened. Threatened species are also referred to as a red-listed species, as they are listed in the IUCN Red List of Threatened Species.

Together rays and  sharks make up the class of modern cartilaginous fishes. Modern fish are either cartilaginous or bony. Cartilaginous fishes have skeletons made of cartilage while bony fishes have skeletons made of bone. Because rays and sharks are closely related, they are often studied together. In 2010 a global IUCN study of vertebrates found that of 1,044 cartilaginous (ray and shark) species examined, 345 or 33% were threatened with extinction.

There are four orders of rays: stingrays, skates, electric rays and sawfishes. Like sharks, rays are relatively long living and thrive in stable populations. They are  K-strategists which grow slowly, mature late sexually and produce few offspring. They cannot recover as rapidly as many faster growing fish can if their populations are depleted. As with sharks, rays are increasingly becoming vulnerable because of commercial and recreational fishing pressures, the impact of non-ray fisheries on the seabed and ray prey species, and other habitat alterations such as damage and loss from coastal development and marine pollution. Most particularly, the continuing decline of threatened rays and sharks is the consequence of unregulated fishing, as illustrated by a recent international survey which listed only 38 species of skates and rays still subsisting in the highly impacted Mediterranean Sea.

Manta rays are largest rays in the world, with wingspans reaching 7 metres. They have one of the highest brain-to-body mass ratios of all fish. Manta populations suffer when they are caught as bycatch by fishermen fishing for other species, but fisheries which target manta rays are even more harmful. Manta rays use their gills to filter plankton from the sea. Demand for their dried gill rakers,  cartilaginous structures protecting the gills, has been growing in traditional Chinese medicine practices. The market is "bogus" since dried manta gills have never been used historically in Chinese medicine, and there is no evidence that the gills have any medicinal value. The flesh is edible and is consumed in some countries, but is tough and unattractive compared to other fish. To fill the growing demand in Asia for gill rakers, targeted fisheries have developed in other parts of the world, including Sri Lanka, Indonesia, West Africa and Central and South America. Each year, thousands of manta rays, primarily the giant manta ray, are being caught and killed purely for their gill rakers.  A fisheries study in Sri Lanka estimated that over a thousand of these were being sold in the country's fish markets each year.

In 2011, manta rays became strictly protected in international waters thanks to their recent inclusion in the Convention on Migratory Species of Wild Animals. The CMS is an international treaty organization concerned with conserving migratory species and habitats on a global scale. Although individual nations were already protecting manta rays, the fish often migrate through unregulated waters, putting them at increased risk from overfishing. In 2013, the Convention on International Trade in Endangered Species (CITES) listed both species of manta rays as CITES Appendix II species. This means that the international trade of manta rays will now be monitored and regulated.

Sawfish are a less well known family of rays which have a long rostrum resembling a saw. Some species can reach  in length. All species of sawfish are either endangered or critically endangered as a result of habitat destruction and overfishing. Their young stay close to shore, and are particularly affected by coastal developments. Because their rostrum is easily entangled, sawfishes can easily become bycatch in fishing nets. They are also exploited for the novelty value of their rostrum, their fins are eaten as a delicacy in China, and their liver oil used as a food supplement. While arguing for a global ban on international commerce in 2007, a representative from the National Museums of Kenya stated, "Only the meat is consumed locally; and artisanal fishermen can retire after catching one sawfish due to the high value of a single rostrum, up to $1,450." In 2013 CITES uplisted the largetooth sawfish to Appendix I. This is CITES highest protection level, and means that all international trade of the species is banned.

According to a 2021 study published in the journal Nature, relative fishing pressure in the oceans has  increased by a factor of 18 since 1970. This overfishing has resulted in the number of oceanic sharks and rays declining globally by 71%, and has increased the global extinction risk to the point where three-quarters of these species are now threatened with extinction. Precautionary science-based catch limits and strict prohibitions are now needed urgently if population collapse is to be avoided, if the disruption of ecological functions is to be averted, and if a start is to be made on rebuilding global fisheries.

List

See also
 List of threatened sharks

References

Further reading
 
 Dulvy, N.K., Baum, J.K., Clarke, S., Compagno, L.J.V., Cortés, E., Domingo, A., Fordham, S., Fowler, S., Francis, M.P., Gibson, C., Martínez, J., Musick, J.A., Soldo, A., Stevens, J.D. and Valenti, S. (2008) "You can swim but you can’t hide: The global status and conservation of oceanic pelagic sharks and rays" Aquatic Conservation: Marine and Freshwater Ecosystems, 18 (5): 459–482.
 FAO (2000) Conservation and Management of Sharks Technical Guidelines for Responsible Fisheries, Rome. .
 Faria VV, McDavitt MT, Charvet P, Wiley TR, Simpfendorfer CA and Naylor GJP (2013) "Species delineation and global population structure of Critically Endangered sawfishes (Pristidae)" Zoological Journal of the Linnean Society, 167 (1): 136–164. 
 Fowler SL, Cavanagh RD, Camhi M, Burgess GH, Cailliet GM, Fordham SV, Simpfendorfer CA and Musick JA (comp. and ed.) (2005) Sharks, Rays and Chimaeras: The Status of the Chondrichthyan Fishes IUCN Shark Specialist Group, Status Survey. .
 Musick, John A and Bonfil, Ramón (2005) Management techniques for elasmobranch fisheries Fisheries Technical Paper 474, FAO, Rome.
 Teutscher, Frans (2004) "Sharks (Chondrichthyes)" In: World markets and industry of selected commercially-exploited aquatic species with an international conservation profile, Camillo Catarci. Fisheries Circular 990, FAO
 Endangered and Threatened Species Under NMFS’ Jurisdiction National Marine Fisheries Service, NOAA. Updated: 28 February 28, 2013.

External links
 Protecting the fragile manta rays of the Maldives BBC, 5 March 2012.

Rays,threatened
Rays,threatened
Rays,threatened
Threatened
Rays